is a train station in Niki, Yoichi District, Hokkaidō, Japan. The station is numbered S20.

Lines

Station layout
The station has two ground-level opposed side platforms serving two tracks. Kitaca is not available. The station is unattended.

Adjacent stations

History
By 28 June 1903, the track had been extended north from Ranshima to Otaru Chūō (now ). After the Hokkaido Railway was nationalized on 1 July 1907, Japanese Government Railways (JGR) took over control of the station. On 12 October 1909 the station became part of the Hakodate Main Line. On 1 April 1987, with the privatization of Japanese National Railways (JNR), the successor of JGR, the station came under the control of JR Hokkaido. From 1 October 2007, station numbering was introduced on JR Hokkaido lines, with Shikaribetsu Station becoming "S20".

References

Railway stations in Hokkaido Prefecture
Railway stations in Japan opened in 1902